What Do You Know, Deutschland? is the second studio album by German industrial band KMFDM, released in December 1986 by Z and Skysaw Records.

Background
What Do You Know, Deutschland? was recorded from 1983–86, with some tracks recorded before En Esch had started working with KMFDM founders Sascha Konietzko and Raymond Watts, some even before the band officially formed in 1984.

Release
Originally released by Z Records in Germany in 1986 with different artwork, the album was re-released, including songs from the "Kickin' Ass" single, in 1987 by SkySaw Records in the United Kingdom. In 1991, Wax Trax! Records released What Do You Know, Deutschland? in the United States without "Zip". "Zip" was later released on the compilation album Agogo.

A remastered reissue of What Do You Know, Deutschland? was released September 12, 2006, featuring new liner notes and photos of the band.

A new version of the track "Kickin' Ass" was released under Watts' musical project PIG in November 2020, featuring guitarwork by Esch.

Reception

Vincent Jeffries of Allmusic said many of the songs lack the "guitar fury" of later releases, but that the album as a whole "has enough industrial grit to keep KMFDM fans interested in, if not awed by its dark intentions".

Track listings

Z Records release (1986)

"Me I Funk" is a partial cover of T. Rex's "Ballrooms of Mars" from The Slider.

SkySaw Records release (1987)
This version was released by Wax Trax! in 1991 (without the track "Zip"), and remastered by Metropolis in 2006 (with "Zip" reinstated).

Personnel
Sascha Konietzko – bass, vocals, guitar, synths, programming
En Esch – vocals, guitars, drums, programming
Raymond Watts – vocals, programming, engineering
Jr. Blackmail – vocals ("Itchy Bitchy", "Lufthans")

References

External links
 
 KMFDM DØTKØM What Do You Know, Deutschland? lyrics at the official KMFDM website

KMFDM albums
1986 albums
Metropolis Records albums
Wax Trax! Records albums